Werner Dittrich (born 9 June 1937) is a retired German weightlifter. He competed at the 1960, 1964, 1968 and 1972 Summer Olympics, first in the lightweight (1960) and later in the middleweight category. His best achievement was sixth place in 1968. Between 1964 and 1968 he won two silver and four bronze medals at European and world championships.

References

1937 births
Living people
People from Bogatynia
Sportspeople from Saxony
Sportspeople from Lower Silesian Voivodeship
German male weightlifters
Olympic weightlifters of the United Team of Germany
Olympic weightlifters of East Germany
Weightlifters at the 1960 Summer Olympics
Weightlifters at the 1964 Summer Olympics
Weightlifters at the 1968 Summer Olympics
Weightlifters at the 1972 Summer Olympics